FFE Transportation Services, Inc. is the primary operating subsidiary of Frozen Food Express Services, Inc. The company is a Lancaster, Texas based temperature-controlled transportation company founded in 1943.
It provides temperature controlled transportation services for over-the-road transportation.  FFE also happens to be the only temperature controlled transportation services company in the United States that offers LTL services throughout the continental United States.

FFE has terminals located throughout the United States in Texas, Georgia, Illinois, Florida, Oregon, Texas, Missouri, California, Utah, Colorado, New Jersey, North Carolina, Ohio and Connecticut.

As of 2013, FFE is now owned by Thomas and James Duff of Columbia, MS.

References

External links 
FFE Transportation Site

Companies based in Dallas
Transport companies established in 1943
Trucking companies of the United States
Companies formerly listed on the Nasdaq
1943 establishments in Texas
Transportation companies based in Texas